Diodora arnoldi is a species of sea snail, a marine gastropod mollusk in the family Fissurellidae, the keyhole limpets and slit limpets.

Distribution
This species occurs in the Pacific Ocean in the sublittoral zone off California.

References

External links
 To Biodiversity Heritage Library (2 publications)
 To Encyclopedia of Life
 To ITIS
 To World Register of Marine Species
 

Fissurellidae
Gastropods described in 1966